Woody Woodpecker is an animated character that appeared in theatrical short films produced by the Walter Lantz Studio and distributed by Universal Studios between 1940 and 1972.

Woody, an anthropomorphic woodpecker, was created in 1940 by Lantz and storyboard artist Ben "Bugs" Hardaway, who had previously laid the groundwork for two other screwball characters, Bugs Bunny and Daffy Duck, at the Warner Bros. cartoon studio in the late 1930s. Woody's character and design evolved over the years, from an insane bird with an unusually garish design to a more refined looking and acting character in the vein of the later Chuck Jones version of Bugs Bunny. Woody was originally voiced by prolific voice actor Mel Blanc, who was succeeded in the shorts by Danny Webb, Kent Rogers, Dick Nelson, Ben Hardaway, and, finally, Grace Stafford (wife of Walter Lantz).

Woody Woodpecker cartoons were first broadcast on television in 1957 under the title The Woody Woodpecker Show, which featured Lantz cartoons bookended by new footage of Woody and live-action footage of Lantz. Lantz produced theatrical cartoons longer than most of his contemporaries, and Woody Woodpecker remained a staple of Universal's release schedule until 1972, when Lantz finally closed down his studio. The character has been revived since then for special productions and occasions, as well as for The New Woody Woodpecker Show, a Saturday-morning cartoon television series featuring prolific voice actor Billy West as Woody that aired from 1999 to 2002. In 2017, a live-action/CGI hybrid feature film, titled simply Woody Woodpecker was released theatrically in Latin America, while released direct-to-video in other territories. That was followed by a new series of shorts released via YouTube beginning in 2018.

Woody has a motion picture star on the Hollywood Walk of Fame at 7000 Hollywood Boulevard. He also made a cameo appearance alongside many other famous cartoon characters in the 1988 film Who Framed Roger Rabbit. Woody Woodpecker is the official mascot of Universal Studios. Woody and his friends are also icons at the Universal Studios Theme Parks worldwide, as well as the PortAventura Park in the Salou, Spain, where they still remain despite Universal no longer having a financial stake in the park.

Origin 
The inspiration for the character allegedly came during producer Walter Lantz's honeymoon with his wife, Grace, in June Lake, California in 1940, a dubious story given the fact that Woody's first appearance predated Lantz and Stafford's honeymoon.  A noisy acorn woodpecker outside their cabin kept the couple awake at night, and when a heavy rain started, they learned that the bird had bored holes in their cabin's roof. As both Walter and Gracie told Dallas attorney Rod Phelps during a visit, Walter wanted to shoot the bird, but Gracie suggested that her husband make a cartoon about the bird, and thus Woody was born.  Woody shares many characteristics in common with the pileated woodpecker in terms of both physical appearance as well as his characteristic laugh, which resembles the call of the pileated woodpecker. These similarities are apparently the result of the artistic license of the creators, and have caused much confusion within the birding community among those who have attempted to classify Woody's species.

In the episode Dumb Like a Fox (of 1964), a museum offers a 25 dollar reward to anyone who captures a Campephilus principalis, which is Woody Woodpecker himself.

History

Early years 
Woody Woodpecker first appeared in the short Knock Knock on November 25, 1940. The cartoon ostensibly stars Andy Panda and his father, Papa Panda, but it is Woody who dominates. The woodpecker constantly pesters the two pandas, apparently just for the fun of it. Andy, meanwhile, tries to sprinkle salt on Woody's tail in the belief that this will somehow capture the bird. To Woody's surprise, Andy's attempts prevail, and Woody is taken away to the psychiatric hospital— but not before his captors prove to be crazier than he is.

The Woody of Knock Knock was designed by animator Alex Lovy. Woody's original voice actor, Mel Blanc, stopped performing the character after the first three cartoons to work exclusively for Leon Schlesinger Productions (later renamed Warner Bros. Cartoons), producer of Warner Bros.' Looney Tunes and Merrie Melodies after signing a loyalty contract. At Leon Schlesinger's, Blanc had already established the voices of two other famous "screwball" characters who preceded Woody, Daffy Duck and Bugs Bunny. Ironically, Blanc's characterization of the Woody Woodpecker laugh had originally been applied to the prototype of Bugs Bunny, in shorts such as the aforementioned Elmer's Candid Camera and was later transferred to Woody. Blanc's regular speaking voice for Woody was much like the early Daffy Duck, minus the lisp. Once Warner Bros. signed Blanc to an exclusive contract, Woody's voice-over work was taken over by Danny Webb, followed by Kent Rogers, Dick Nelson and Ben Hardaway later became Woody's voice after Rogers was sent to the army during World War II, and would voice the woodpecker for the rest of the decade. This makes Woody Woodpecker one of the very few cartoon characters originally voiced by Mel Blanc to be voiced by someone else during Blanc's lifetime. Despite this, Blanc continued to voice Woody on a Mutual Network radio show and in recordings for Capitol Records from 1948 until 1955, while his laugh would continue to be used in the shorts until 1951.

Audiences reacted well to Knock Knock, and Lantz realized he had finally hit upon a star to replace the waning Oswald the Lucky Rabbit. Woody starred in a number of films. With his brash demeanor, the character was a natural hit during World War II. His image appeared on US aircraft as nose art, and on mess halls, and audiences on the homefront watched Woody cope with familiar problems such as food shortages. The 1943 Woody cartoon The Dizzy Acrobat was nominated for the 1943 Academy Award for Best Short Subject (Cartoons), which it lost to the MGM Tom and Jerry cartoon The Yankee Doodle Mouse. Woody Woodpecker's debut also marked a change in directing style for Walter Lantz studio, since the character was heavily inspired by Tex Avery-created Looney Tunes character Daffy Duck at Warner Bros, and thus Woody's cartoons tended to have a hint of Tex Avery's style and influence in terms of humor, and that's what gave Walter Lantz studio its fame. Curiously enough, Avery himself never directed a Woody Woodpecker short while at the Walter Lantz studio.

Animator Emery Hawkins and layout artist Art Heinemann streamlined Woody's appearance for the 1944 film The Barber of Seville, directed by James "Shamus" Culhane. The bird became rounder, cuter, and less demented. He also sported a simplified color scheme and a brighter smile, making him much more like his counterparts at Warner Bros. and MGM. Nevertheless, Culhane continued to use Woody as an aggressive lunatic, not a domesticated straight man or defensive homebody, as many other studios' characters had become. The follow-up to The Barber of Seville, The Beach Nut, introduced Woody's original chief nemesis, Wally Walrus.

Woody's wild days were numbered, however. In 1946, Lantz hired Disney veteran Dick Lundy to direct Woody's cartoons. Lundy rejected Culhane's take on the series and made Woody more defensive; no longer did the bird go insane without a legitimate reason. Lundy also paid more attention to the animation, making Woody's new films more Disney-esque in their design, style, animation, and timing. Lundy's last film for Disney was the Donald Duck short Flying Jalopy. This cartoon is played much like a Woody Woodpecker short, down to the laugh in the end. It also features a bad guy named "Ben Buzzard" who bears a strong resemblance to Buzz Buzzard, a Lantz character introduced in Wet Blanket Policy (1948), who eventually succeeded Wally Walrus as Woody's primary antagonist.

In 1947, contract renewal negotiations between Lantz and Universal (now Universal-International) fell through, and Lantz began distributing his cartoons through United Artists. The UA-distributed Lantz cartoons featured higher-quality animation, the influence of Dick Lundy (the films' budgets remained the same). Former Disney animators such as Fred Moore and Ed Love began working at Lantz, and assisted Lundy in adding touches of the Disney style to Woody's cartoons. Despite the Disney style added for the later cartoons, Woody's cartoons still try to maintain a good dose of slapstick and madcap humor from the pre-Lundy cartoons.

"The Woody Woodpecker Song" 
In 1947, Woody got his own theme song when musicians George Tibbles and Ramey Idriss wrote "The Woody Woodpecker Song", making ample use of the character's famous laugh. Kay Kyser's 1948 recording of the song, with Harry Babbitt's laugh interrupting vocalist Gloria Wood, became one of the biggest hit singles of 1948. Other artists did covers, including Woody's original voice actor, Mel Blanc. Lantz first used "The Woody Woodpecker Song" in  Wet Blanket Policy (1948), and it became the first and only song from an animated short subject to be nominated for the Academy Award for Best Original Song in 1948 but it lost out to “Buttons and Bows”. Lantz soon adopted the song as Woody's theme music, and due to the song's popularity, Woody Woodpecker fan clubs sprang up, theaters held "Woody" matinées, and boys got the "Woody Woodpecker" haircut.

"The Woody Woodpecker Song" and the Woody Woodpecker cartoons made extensive use of Woody's famous laugh, upsetting the man who created it, Mel Blanc. (He first used the laugh, in a different recording, for the seminal pre-Bugs Bunny character in 1938's Porky's Hare Hunt.) Although Blanc had only recorded three shorts as the voice of Woody, his laugh had been recorded as a stock sound effect and used in every subsequent Woody Woodpecker short up until this point. Blanc sued Lantz and lost, but Lantz settled out of court when Blanc filed an appeal. Although Lantz stopped using Blanc's Woody Woodpecker laugh as a stock effect in the early 1950s, Blanc's voice was still heard saying "Guess who?" at the beginning of every cartoon for the duration of the Woody Woodpecker series.

Financial impasse/hiatus
Financial problems at United Artists during the aftermath of the Paramount case—which forced movie distributors to end the practice of block booking, or selling shorts and features to theaters in packages—affected Lantz. The revenues Lantz received from UA's distribution of his cartoons were much lower than his returns had been from Universal, and once the Lantz studio hit its loan debt cap of $250,000 at the Bank of America, Lantz was forced to shut the studio down. He began a series of staggered layoffs in December 1948 until work on the final 1940s Lantz short, the Woody cartoon Drooler's Delight, was finished at the otherwise shuttered studio in early 1949.

Walter Lantz Productions remained closed for a full calendar year. During this time, Walter Lantz and his wife, actress Grace Stafford, toured Europe, in order to spend money impounded there after World War II and also to entertain the European Universal exchanges still distributing the Universal era Lantz cartoons. By keeping the studio closed while the Universal and United Artists Woody Woodpecker cartoons were still in distribution, Lantz was able to amass enough income to pay off the studio's debts and upgrade the studio, after which time the studio finally reopened with a reduced staff.

Later films 
The revived Lantz studio's first new project was an animated segment of the feature film Destination Moon (1950), produced by Lantz's friend George Pál. In the segment, astronauts are shown an animated educational film featuring Woody Woodpecker explaining rocket propulsion.

Beginning with Destination Moon, Woody's voice was assumed by Grace Stafford. According to the Lantzes, Stafford slipped a recording of herself into a stack of audition tapes, and her husband chose her without knowing her identity. Lantz also began having Stafford supply Woody's laugh, due to the court settlement with Mel Blanc. Stafford was not credited at her own request until Misguided Missile (1958), as she felt audiences might reject a woman performing Woody's voice. Stafford also did her best to tone down the character through her voice work, to appease Universal's complaints about Woody's raucousness.

Lantz signed again with Universal (now Universal-International) in 1950, and began production on two entries that director Dick Lundy and storymen Ben Hardaway and Heck Allen had begun before the 1948 layoff. These shorts have no director's credit, as Lantz claimed to have directed them himself. Puny Express (1951) was the first to be released, followed by Sleep Happy. These shorts marked a departure from past dialogue-driven shorts. Though Stafford now voiced Woody, her job was limited, as Woody (and other characters) rarely spoke in the first dozen or so shorts. It was because of these entries that Woody became popular outside the English-speaking world, thanks to the lack of a language barrier. (The Pink Panther shorts of the 1960s and 1970s also enjoyed worldwide popularity due to this pantomime luxury.)

Nine more Lantz-directed Woody cartoons followed, before Don Patterson became Woody's new director in 1952. The bird was redesigned again, this time by animator LaVerne Harding. Harding made Woody smaller, cuter, and moved his crest forward from its original backwards position. (The small Lantz Studios logo seen at the start of every cartoon — Woody as an armored knight on horseback carrying a lance — continued for a while to display Woody with his former topknot.) For 1955's The Tree Medic, one last makeover was given to the woodpecker, making Woody's eye a simple black dot and taking away the green/hazel iris he had had since his beginnings. However, Woody's eyes were not changed in the cartoon's intros, and they remained green for the rest of the shorts' production run. During this time, the intro was changed as well. Instead of having Woody's name on-screen and Woody pecking a hole in the screen to introduce himself, Woody now pecked his way onto the screen, greeting the audience with his iconic "Guess who?", then carved out his name on either a brown or gray wood background and jumped around the screen while laughing.

By 1955, Paul J. Smith had taken over as primary director of Woody's shorts, with periodic fill-in shorts directed by Alex Lovy and Jack Hannah, among others. With Smith on board, the shorts maintained a healthy dose of frenetic energy, while the animation itself was simplified, due to budget constraints.

In addition to Lantz's wife Grace Stafford providing Woody's voice, which returned the cartoon to being more dialogue-driven again, voice talents during this period were generally split between Dal McKennon and Daws Butler. Several of Woody's recurring costars were also introduced during this era, such as Gabby Gator (voiced by Daws Butler in an Ozarks voice, a slightly different southern dialect than he used for Huckleberry Hound). Gabby first appeared in Everglade Raid (as "Al I. Gator"). Other films paired Woody with a girlfriend, Winnie Woodpecker (voiced by Grace Stafford), and a niece and nephew, Splinter and Knothead (both voiced by June Foray). Other antagonists that Woody has dealt with were Ms. Meany (voiced by Grace Stafford) and Dapper Denver Dooley (voiced by Dallas McKennon).

Woody in the television era 
As Lantz was struggling financially, Woody's longevity was secured when he made the jump to television in The Woody Woodpecker Show on ABC. The half-hour program consisted of three theatrical Woody shorts followed by a brief look at cartoon creation hosted by Lantz. It ran from 1957 to 1958 then entered syndication until 1966. NBC revived the show in 1970 and 1976. In addition, the woodpecker was no longer dishing out abuse to his foils, but was instead on the receiving end. The first significant short to feature Woody as a serious, put-upon character was 1961's Franken-Stymied. Woody's popularity had been based on his manic craziness, but by 1961, this had all but been eliminated in favor of a more serious Woody, a straight man trying to do good. This was due in part to Woody's large presence on television, which meant Lantz had to meet the stringent rules against violence for children's television. Though production continued until 1972, the cartoons were a definite notch lower than in the 1940s and 1950s.

Woody appeared in new theatrical shorts until 1972, when Lantz closed his studio due to rising production costs. His cartoons returned to syndication in the late 1970s. Lantz sold his library of Woody shorts to MCA/Universal in 1985. Universal repackaged the cartoons for another syndicated Woody Woodpecker Show in 1987. A year later, Woody made a cameo in Who Framed Roger Rabbit, voiced by Cherry Davis, near the end of the film.

Woody Woodpecker reappeared in the Fox Kids series The New Woody Woodpecker Show, which ran on Saturday mornings from 1999 to 2002, voiced by Billy West. For this series, Woody was redesigned more like his mid-1940s look (1944 to 1949), pushing back his crest and making his eyes green again. Winnie Woodpecker, who had debuted in Real Gone Woody (1954), became a semi-regular character as Woody's primary love interest. Like Woody, Winnie was redesigned to look almost exactly like Woody did from 1950 until 1972, the obvious differences being that she was a female woodpecker and had blue eyes. Woody's primary antagonist was Wally Walrus, who became Woody's neighbor (Woody lived in a tree house in Mrs. Meany's front yard, and Wally lived next door). Buzz Buzzard often appeared, as did Mrs. Meany and several other older characters.

In 2018, Universal Animation Studios announced a new series of Woody Woodpecker cartoons exclusively for YouTube. The result, titled simply Woody Woodpecker, began streaming on December 3, 2018.

Reception 

The Woody Woodpecker Show was named the 88th best animated series by IGN.

Legacy 
Walter Lantz and movie pioneer George Pal were good friends. Woody Woodpecker cameos in nearly every film that Pal produced or directed—for example, during the 1966 sequence in The Time Machine (1960), a little girl drops her Woody Woodpecker doll as she goes into an air raid shelter. In Doc Savage: The Man of Bronze (1975), Grace Stafford cameos, carrying a Woody Woodpecker doll.

In the Baltimora song, Woody Boogie. The song uses the laughter of Woody Woodpecker throughout the song.

Obvious references to "The Woody Woodpecker Song" can be found in the work of at least two noted jazz innovators: specifically, Charlie Parker, a number of whose solos quote it in passing, and Wayne Shorter, whose 1961 composition "Look at the Birdie"—as heard on Art Blakey and the Jazz Messengers' Roots & Herbs (recorded 1961, released 1970)—has been singled out by both composer/trumpeter David Weiss and  Shorter biographer Michelle Mercer as an ingenious variation on the theme. In addition, a full-fledged cover of the song itself was recorded in 1986 by jazz trumpeter Woody Shaw for his 1987 release, Solid.

Woody was number 46 on TV Guide'''s list of the 50 Greatest Cartoon Characters of All Time in 2002 and 2003. He came in at number 25 on Animal Planet's list of The 50 Greatest Movie Animals in 2004. The character has been referenced and spoofed on many later television programs, among them The Simpsons, American Dad!, South Park, The Fairly OddParents, Family Guy, Seinfeld, Robot Chicken, Three's Company, and Flash Toons.

Like Bugs Bunny for Warner Bros., Sonic the Hedgehog for SEGA, Mario for Nintendo and Mickey Mouse for Disney, Woody Woodpecker serves as the official mascot of Universal Studios. In 1998 and 1999, Woody appeared on the nose of the Williams Formula One Team, and in 2000, he became the official team mascot of the Honda Motorcycle Racing Team. A Woody Woodpecker balloon had been a staple of the Macy's Thanksgiving Day Parade from 1982 until 1996.

In Brazil the character is a hugely popular and iconic cartoon character.

 Home media 

A handful of non-comprehensive Woody Woodpecker VHS tapes were issued by Universal in the 1980s and 1990s, usually including Andy Panda and Chilly Willy cartoons as bonuses. A few were widely released on VHS in the mid-1980s by Kid Pics Video, an American company of dubious legality, which packaged the Woody cartoons with bootlegged Disney cartoons. In the early 2000s, a series of mail-order Woody Woodpecker Show VHS tapes and DVDs were made available by mail order through Columbia House.

In 2007, Universal Studios Home Entertainment released The Woody Woodpecker and Friends Classic Cartoon Collection, a three-disc DVD boxed set compilation of Walter Lantz "Cartunes". The first forty-five Woody Woodpecker shorts from Knock Knock to The Great Who-Dood-It were presented in the box set in chronological order of release, with various Chilly Willy, Andy Panda, Swing Symphonies, and other Lantz shorts also included. The Woody Woodpecker and Friends Classic Cartoon Collection: Volume 2, including the next forty-five Woody cartoons—Termites from Mars through Jittery Jester—was released in 2008. A plain-vanilla best-of release, titled Woody Woodpecker Favorites, was released in 2009, which contained no new-to-DVD material.Woody Woodpecker shorts have been released for the first time on Blu-ray; labeled as the "Screwball Collection", the set was released on September 7, 2021.

 Voice actors 
United States
Mel Blanc (cartoons: 1940–1941; Capitol Records: 1948–1955)
Danny Webb (1941)
Kent Rogers (1942–1943)
Dick Nelson (1943)
Ben Hardaway (1944–1949)
Lee Sweetland (singing voice in The Barber of Seville, The Beach Nut, Ski for Two, The Dippy Diplomat and Smoked Hams)"Woody Woodpecker in “Ski For Two” (1944)". Retrieved October 14, 2020.
Theodore von Eltz (Sally in Hollywoodland [unaired radio pilot])
Harry Babbitt ("The Woody Woodpecker Song")
Danny Kaye (1948 "The Woody Woodpecker Song" cover)
Grace Stafford (1950–1991)
Dallas McKennon (monster sounds in Monster of Ceremonies)
Cherry Davis (1988; Who Framed Roger Rabbit)
Dave Spafford (1991; 63rd Academy Awards)
Billy West (1998–2002)
Eric Kelso (2001; Universal Studios Japan, Universal Studios Theme Parks Adventure)
Seth Green (2014; Robot Chicken)
Eric Bauza (2017–present)
Other countries
Katsue Miwa and Kumiko Watanabe (Japan)
Olney Cazarré (Brazil) 1960s / 1980s
Garcia Júnior (Brazil) 1970s
Marco Antônio Costa (Brazil) 1990s / 2000s
Sérgio Stern (Brazil) 2017–present
Natalia Gurzo (Russia) 1996–1998/2000s
Jorge Arvizu (Mexico)
Stavros Mavridis (Greece) 2005–2007
Dimitris Marizas (Greece) 2007–2009
Dieter Kursawe (Germany)
Mića Tatić (Yugoslavia/Serbia)

Blanc originated the voice, in a characterization similar to his Daffy Duck, minus the lisp, with the recording slightly sped up to give a higher-pitched tone to the voice. He stated that the laugh originated from a type of laugh he used to do at school and he just added the pecking sounds to the laugh. That practice continued with other voice artists.

 Filmography
 Theatrical cartoons See Woody Woodpecker filmography TV series 

 Public Service Let's All Recycle with Woody Woodpecker (1991 – PSA Video)

 Other appearances Who Framed Roger Rabbit (1988, cameo)Kids for Character (1996)

 Film 

In the early 2010s, Universal Studios and Illumination Entertainment planned a Woody Woodpecker feature film. John Altschuler and Dave Krinsky (King of the Hill) were in talks to develop a story, but the project was canceled. In October 2013, Bill Kopp announced that Universal Pictures had hired him to direct an animated feature film with three interwoven stories.

On July 13, 2016, Cartoon Brew reported that Universal 1440 Entertainment was filming a live-action/CGI hybrid film based on Woody Woodpecker in Canada. The film is being directed by Alex Zamm and stars Timothy Omundson of Galavant and Psych fame and Brazilian actress Thaila Ayala. Filming began in June 2016, and ended later in July of that year. The film was released theatrically in Brazil on October 5, 2017, and was scheduled for release on April 1, 2018, worldwide. The film had a straight-to-video release in the United States on February 6, 2018.

 Comics 
Woody was the star of a number of comic book series published in the U.S. and around the world. The main title, Walter Lantz Woody Woodpecker, ran from 1952 to 1983.

Woody first appeared as a comic book character in 1942, appearing alongside Andy Panda and Oswald the Rabbit in Dell Comics' New Funnies, an anthology comic that featured a number of other Lantz characters. Eventually, Woody became the star of New Funnies, leading to Woody Woodpecker solo comics appearing as part of Dell Comics' Four Color Comics one-shot series, beginning in 1947.Walter Lantz Woody Woodpecker became an independent comic book (starting with issue #16 to reflect the earlier appearances in Four Color) in Dec. 1952-Jan. 1953. It ran for 201 issues, published by Dell and then Western Publishing (Whitman/Gold Key), lasting until 1983.

Woody's niece and nephew Splinter and Knothead first made their appearances in the comics, later appearing in the cartoons.

Notable creators involved with the Woody Woodpecker comic included Carl Fallberg, Paul Murry, Tony Strobl, Frank Thomas, and in the European comics, Freddy Milton.

Woody also starred in a short-lived comic strip, syndicated by Consolidated News Features, in the early 1950s.

Foreign-language versions of the Woody Woodpecker comic were published in many European countries, most actively in Sweden ("Hacke Hackspett"), the Netherlands, France, and Italy ("Picchiarello").

 Video games 
Several Woody Woodpecker video games were released for Mega Drive/Genesis, PlayStation, PlayStation 2, Microsoft Windows, Game Boy Color, Game Boy Advance, 3DO Interactive Multiplayer. and iOS.Woody Woodpecker #1, Woody Woodpecker #2, and Woody Woodpecker #3 (1994) for the 3DOFérias Frustradas do Pica-Pau (translation: Woody Woodpecker Frustrated Vacation) (1996) for Mega Drive and Master System (made by Tectoy, sold only in Brazil)Woody Woodpecker Racing (2000) for PlayStation, Windows, and GBCWoody Woodpecker: Escape from Buzz Buzzard Park (2001) for GBC, Windows, and PS2Universal Studios Theme Parks Adventure (2001) for GameCubeWoody Woodpecker in Crazy Castle 5 (2002) for GBAWoody Woodpecker: Wacky Challenge (2010) for mobile phoneWoody Woodpecker In Waterfools (2010) for mobile phoneWoody Woodpecker (App)'' (2012) for iOS

Mattel purchased the rights for a Woody Woodpecker Intellivision game, and Grace Stafford recorded new dialog for the game, but it was not completed.

Maruhon has released a series of pachinko games in Japan.

See also 
List of Walter Lantz cartoons
List of Walter Lantz cartoon characters

References

External links 
Official Universal Pictures Woody Woodpecker site

Woody Woodpecker at Don Markstein's Toonopedia
Woody Woodpecker profile at the Walter Lantz Cartune Encyclopedia
Watch Woody Woodpecker in the public domain Pantry Panic (1941)
Woody Woodpecker on the Internet Movie Database

 
Animated characters
Comedy film characters
Comedy television characters
Animated film series
Corporate mascots
Universal Pictures cartoons and characters
Film characters introduced in 1940
Film series introduced in 1940
Anthropomorphic birds
Fictional birds
Fictional tricksters
Male characters in animation
Male characters in comics
Walter Lantz
Bird mascots
Film studio mascots
Mascots introduced in 1940
Woodpeckers
Walter Lantz Productions cartoons and characters